The individual special dressage competition at the 2006 FEI World Equestrian Games was held between August 22 and August 25, 2006.

Medalists

Complete results

Round 1
The first round of the individual special dressage competition was held on August 22 and August 23, 2006.

Debbie McDonald withdrew prior to the final due to a veterinary concern with her horse, Brentina.

Final
The final round of the individual special dressage competition was held on August 25, 2006.

References

External links
Official list of competitors
Official results
Round 1
Final

Dressage